Cyril Browne may refer to:

 Snuffy Browne (1890–1964), West Indian cricketer
 Cyril Browne (cricketer) (1893–1948), English cricketer